Percilia irwini is a species of perch-like fish in the family Perciliidae found only in the Malleco and Bio-Bio River basins in Chile.

References

irwini
Taxonomy articles created by Polbot
Fish described in 1928
Endemic fauna of Chile